Rivett is a suburb of Canberra, Australian Capital Territory.

Rivett may also refer to:

People
 Albert Rivett (pastor) (1855–1934), Australian pacifist
 Chris Rivett (born 1979), English sporting club chairman
 Sir David Rivett (1885–1961), Australian chemist and science administrator
 Francis Rivett (c. 1596–1669), English landowner and politician
 Mitch Rivett (born 1989), Australian rugby league player
 Rohan Rivett (1917–1977), Australian journalist and POW

Other uses
 Mount Rivett, Mac. Robertson Land, Antarctica

See also
 Rivett-Carnac baronets, United Kingdom
 Rivet (disambiguation)
 Rivette (disambiguation)